Kevin Hart's Guide to Black History is a Netflix variety special starring Kevin Hart.

Premise 
Kevin Hart's Guide to Black History is a guide to African-American black history through re-enactments with a familial sitcom set-up and archival footage.

Cast
 Kevin Hart as Himself
 Steve Agee as President Grant / Lou Cypher / Drunk Dave
 Derek Basco as Ootah (Eskimo Guide)
 Brad Berryhill as Confederate Sentry / Medic
 Kirk Bovill as Confederate Sentry
 Jeff Bowser as Captain William Postell
 Barry Brewer as Matthew Henson
 James Callis as President Lincoln / Confederate Captain
 Al Shearer as Robert Smalls
 Lonnie Chavis as Robert Smalls' Son
 Brandi Conley as Swooning Bombshell Woman
 Justin Dray as Union Captain
 Nathaniel Edwards as Charles de Gaulle
 John Ennis as Postal Worker 1 / Audience Member 1
 Philip Friedman as Patient
 Josh Gardner as Confederate Sailor
 Greg Germann as Dr. Blalock
 Tiffany Haddish as Mae Jemison
 Lil Rel Howery as Himself / Henry "Box" Brown
 Gerald "Slink" Johnson as William Tillman
 Tom Kenny as Robert Peary
 Alphonso McAuley as Vivien Thomas
 Alanah McClanahan as young Mae Jemison
 Nika Williams as Josephine Baker
 "Weird Al" Yankovic as Jeremy's dad

Release
It was released on February 8, 2019 on Netflix streaming.

References

External links
 
 
 

English-language television shows
Netflix specials
2019 television specials